The 2021 Virginia elections were held on Tuesday, November 2, 2021. Republicans swept all three statewide races and won back control of the House of Delegates in an upset. Primary elections were held on June 8, 2021.

Governor 

Incumbent Democratic governor Ralph Northam was unable to run for reelection, as the Constitution of Virginia prohibits the officeholder from serving consecutive terms. Glenn Youngkin won the gubernatorial election against former Governor Terry McAuliffe.

Lieutenant Governor 

Incumbent lieutenant governor Justin Fairfax was eligible to run for a second term, but instead ran for governor, being defeated in the Democratic primary. Though Fairfax won the last lieutenant governor race with almost 53% of the vote, Republican Winsome Sears won this election by almost two points, becoming the first woman, the first woman of color, and the first Jamaican American chosen for the post.

Attorney General 

Incumbent attorney general Mark Herring ran for re-election to a third term. He was re-elected in 2017 with 53.3% of the vote. A primary challenge by delegate Jay Jones was supported by Governor Ralph Northam, as well as several federal and state legislators. Jason Miyares was elected the first Cuban American and Hispanic Attorney General of Virginia.

House of Delegates 

All 100 seats in the Virginia House of Delegates were up for election. The chamber was controlled by Democrats after the 2019 elections, holding a majority of ten seats. The chamber returned to the Republican Party following the 2021 elections, electing Todd Gilbert as the Speaker of the House.

References 

 
Virginia